The Eurovision Song Contest 2004 was the 49th edition of the Eurovision Song Contest. Organised by the European Broadcasting Union (EBU) and host broadcaster Turkish Radio and Television Corporation (TRT), the contest was held at the Abdi İpekçi Arena, and, for the first time, consisted of a semi-final on 12 May, and a final on 15 May 2004. The two live shows were presented by Turkish actors Korhan Abay and Meltem Cumbul. It was the first time that Turkey had hosted the contest, 29 years after the country made its debut, and was also the first time since the  contest in Birmingham that it was not hosted in the host country's capital city.

Thirty-six countries participated in the contest, beating the record of twenty-six in the previous edition. Albania, Andorra, Belarus and Serbia and Montenegro took part for the first time this year. The old relegation system was replaced with a semi-final format. This was done in order to accommodate the increasing number of countries who wished to participate. The new format allowed all countries to participate every year, rather than being forced to sit out per the relegation rules, which had been the standard since . Because of this, Denmark, Finland, Lithuania, Macedonia, Monaco and Switzerland all returned to the contest, Monaco not having competed since .

The winner was Ukraine with the song "Wild Dances", performed by Ruslana who wrote it with her husband Oleksandr Ksenofontov. This was Ukraine's first victory in the contest, only one year after the country made its debut in 2003. Serbia and Montenegro, Greece, Turkey, Cyprus and Sweden rounded out the top five. Due to the expansion of the contest, this year was the first time in which a non-winning entry scored over 200 points. Prior to this contest, only the winning entries in 1994 and 1997 had passed this mark. In this contest, the top 3 songs all got over 200 points. An official CD was released and, for the first time, the entire contest was released on DVD which included the semi-final and the final.

Location 

Istanbul was chosen as the host city of the 2004 edition following Turkey's victory in the  contest in Riga, Latvia with Sertab Erener's "Everyway That I Can". Originally the Mydonose Showland, an entertainment center in the form of a giant pyramid tent near to Atatürk International Airport was chosen by host broadcaster TRT to host the event, but was later changed to the Abdi İpekçi Arena as the contest approached due to its bigger capacity. The Mydonose Showland, renamed later to Istanbul Show Center, was demolished in 2009 after a fire destroyed it in April that year. The Abdi İpekçi Arena closed after the 2016/2017 basketball season and was demolished in early 2018.

A number of other venues in the city were reported as possible venues, these included Ataköy Athletics Arena and Istanbul Lütfi Kırdar International Convention and Exhibition Center (ICEC), the latter of which lost out to Mydonose Showland. Istanbul Chamber of Commerce president Mehmet Yıldırım offered the World Trade Center Istanbul (WTCI) as a venue for the event and confirmed that the Chamber would also provide financial support for the contest's organisation.

Format

Visual design

The contest's new official generic logo was used for the first time this year, with the heart-shaped flag in the centre due to be changed for future contests. The slogan for Istanbul's contest was "Under the Same Sky", which communicated the importance of a united Europe and Turkish integration.

Voting structure 
Every country in the competition, including those who did not qualify for the final, were allowed to vote for other countries. After all performances were completed, each country opened their phone lines to allow their viewers to vote for their favourite song. Voting for the country in which you are situated is not allowed, however. Each country awarded points based on the number of votes cast for each song: the song which received the most viewer votes was awarded 12 points, the second 10 points, the third 8 points and then 7, 6, 5, etc. down to 1.

In the event of a tie, the number of countries to vote for the tying songs would be counted, and the song having the most countries awarding points to it, would be the winner. In the event of a further tie, then the previously used method of counting back on the number of 12 points, 10 points etc., would be used to find an eventual winner.

This was also the first year that the scores were only re-read by the hosts in one language. Before 2004 every point was repeated in French and English, but due to 36 countries voting, and more in years to come, in 2004 to save time the hosts only re-read each score in one language. This was in the opposite of the original country representative spoke in.

Opening and interval acts
A new ABBA video was shown in the semi-final, briefly outlining how ABBA started and what the response was of the first record company they approached. It featured small puppets of the band performing snippets of their songs (the voices being the ones of the band) and featured Rik Mayall as the record company manager. Due to copyright purposes, this was cut from the Eurovision Song Contest DVD and released separately, due to which references to the video that were made running up to the showing of it were also cut.

In the semi-final and the final, Meltem Cumbul warmed up the audience with a sing-a-long of Eurovision classic "Nel blu dipinto di blu (Volare)", originally performed by Domenico Modugno. Sertab Erener returned to the stage in the final to perform "Everyway That I Can", the 2003 winning song, and one of her new songs called "Leave". Sertab also interviewed contestants in the green room. The Turkish dance ensemble Fire of Anatolia performed as the interval act.

Participating countries 
This year's Eurovision contest was the first to be a two-day event, with one qualifying round held on a Wednesday and the grand final held on the following Saturday.

Hungary would eventually return to the contest one year later.

All participating countries had the right to vote in both the qualifying round and the grand final. This was the first year in which all 36 participating countries voted based on a public phone vote, in the final. However ,  and  did not broadcast the semi-final (as they were not participating in it) and therefore did not give votes for it like the other thirty-three countries. In Belgium, the French-language RTBF did not broadcast the semi-final, but the Dutch-language VRT did. Monaco's televoting results in the semi final were rendered invalid and a back-up jury had to be used, but no problems occurred in the final.

Returning artists

Semi-final 
The semi-final was held on 12 May 2004 at 21:00 (CET). 22 countries performed and all participants voted except France, Poland and Russia who opted not to broadcast the show.

Final 
The finalists were:
 the top 10 countries from the 2003 contest (other than the automatic qualifiers);
 the top 10 countries from the 2004 semi-final.

Detailed voting results

Semi-final

12 points 
Below is a summary of all 12 points in the semi-final:

Final

12 points 
Below is a summary of all 12 points in the final:

Spokespersons 
Each country appointed a spokesperson to announce their respective country's points in the final. The voting order in the 2004 contest was determined alphabetically by each country's ISO two-letter country code.

 Pati Molné
 
 
 Mija Martina
 
 Denis Kurian
 Emel Aykanat
 
 Loukas Hamatsos
 Thomas Anders
 Camilla Ottesen
 Maarja-Liis Ilus
 Anne Igartiburu
 Anna Stenlund
 
 Lorraine Kelly
 Alexis Kostalas
 Barbara Kolar
 Johnny Logan
 Merav Miller
 Sigrún Ósk Kristjánsdóttir
 
 Lauris Reiniks
 Anne Allegrini
 Karolina Petkovska
 Claire Agius
 Esther Hart
 Ingvild Helljesen
 
 
 Andreea Marin
 Yana Churikova
 Jovan Radomir
 Peter Poles
 Meltem Ersan Yazgan
 Pavlo Shylko

Broadcasts

Incidents 
Just before the Slovenian entry was about to be performed, the Turkish broadcaster accidentally took a commercial break which meant the Slovenian song was not heard by Turkish viewers. There were technical problems when in a short hiatus halfway through the songs used for the advertising break the hosts tried to contact various parties in Europe. They tried contacting Germany, Spain and Turkey, but in the end were only able to get a response from Germany. During the Romanian postcard introduction, the information for the Romanian entry appeared on the screen, but was quickly taken away. A final minor hiccup occurred when, on her way to present the winner the trophy, Sertab Erener got her shoe stuck in a speaker grill by the side of the stage and had to be freed by stagehands. However this did not delay proceedings, and other than the above the show ran smoothly.

An hour after the semi-final had been aired, the European Broadcasting Union discovered that there had been problems with the vote counting in Monaco and Croatia. Digame, an affiliate of Deutsche Telekom, who had been responsible for processing all the votes (from 2004), reported that they had encountered problems with their calculation software, and there was a problem with text message voting in Croatia. When the votes were counted, results showed that Croatia had awarded themselves 4 points, which is against Eurovision rules. Later, an official EBU statement read that there had been technical problems at the side of the Croatian mobile service provider, who neglected to delete the illegal votes from the results. Consequently, some votes were not counted in the results announced at the end of the broadcast of the semi-final. When the results were corrected to include these additional votes, they were found not to have affected which countries had qualified for the final.

This year was also notable as it was the first year that Turkey voted for Cyprus and the second year in a row that Cyprus voted for Turkey. Nevertheless, in a move that angered some Cypriots, when the country presented its votes no map of the island was shown (all other presenters were preceded with their country being highlighted on a map). This was due to Turkey's recognition of the northern half of the island as an independent republic (not recognised by any other state). It is likely Turkey pulled out of showing the map because it would have only highlighted the southern portion of the island, and thus angered the international community.

Other awards
In addition to the main winner's trophy, the AP Awards and the Marcel Bezençon Awards were contested during the 2004 Eurovision Song Contest.

AP Awards

Marcel Bezençon Awards
The Marcel Bezençon Awards, organised since 2002 by Sweden's then-Head of Delegation and 1992 representative Christer Björkman, and 1984 winner Richard Herrey, honours songs in the contest's final. The awards are divided into three categories: the Artistic Award which was voted by previous winners of the contest, the Composer Award, and the Press Award.

Official album 

Eurovision Song Contest: Istanbul 2004 was the official compilation album of the 2004 contest, put together by the European Broadcasting Union and released by EMI Records and CMC International on 26 April 2004. The album featured all 36 songs that entered in the 2004 contest, including the semi-finalists that failed to qualify into the grand final.

Charts

Notes

References

External links 

 Official website
 EBU press notice regarding voting problems in the semi-final
 Details about the 2004 Eurovision Song Contest in Istanbul
 Video Clips (BBC Eurovision 2004) (RealPlayer)

 
2004
Music festivals in Turkey
2004 in Turkey
2000s in Istanbul
2004 song contests
Music in Istanbul
May 2004 events in Europe
Events in Istanbul